The Curry Awards is an award given to curry restaurants in the United Kingdom, which have achieved "total excellence" in all departments by The Curry Club in association with its publication, The Good Curry Guide.

The Good Curry Guide Awards ceremony was established in May 1991 by Pat Chapman and was the first awards ceremony of any restaurant sector.

History
Pat Chapman’s first Good Curry Guide was published in 1984. About 600 Indian restaurants were selected for entry (out of the 4,000 that existed then) and it carried little critical information. The next edition (1987) addressed this by having critical entries from correspondents. No one restaurant was rated higher than any other. In other words neither of these editions named the ‘Best in Class’; Chapman considered that since only the top percentage achieved entry, all entries were ‘Good Curry Guide Restaurants’. The publication attracted considerable media attention. However journalists and food writers from such publications as The Evening Standard, The Daily Telegraph, The Times, and  BBC Good Food Magazine pressured Chapman to name the best.

Chapman asked his correspondents which restaurants could qualify into a TOP 30 category (which became TOP 100 in 1995), and which could be best regionally and best in UK. The results were duly published in the 1991 Guide and to launch it Chapman decided to hold an Awards Ceremony for the winners. Unlike today, it was a time when there were few such ceremonies.  Chapman modelled it on the Academy Award, by commencing with a formal presention of a certificate to each winner in turn before a group of their peers and media, and following with a luncheon to emphasise the event's social side.  On that first ceremony, there were eight winners, including Chutney Mary Indian restaurant London, SW10 as Best in UK, where the event was held.  
Media and public response to this was enormous.  So by the time the next GCG was due for publication, the TOP 30 was increased to the new TOP 100 category, and from that no less than 18 ‘Best in Category were to be awarded.
It was clear a bigger venue was needed, and one which was divorced from winning restaurants.  Chapman had been to an Asian wedding at a Heathrow Hotel where the catering was by Madhu’s.  Chapman suggested they did his catering and the Park Lane Hotel was chosen with a seating capacity of 330 seats.  It was the first time Madhu’s had catered for any event other than Asian weddings.  Chapman organised the entire event.  Of the 300 seats, 80 were taken by media.

Present
Between 18 and 20 Awards are given before an audience of restaurant personnel and their guests, sponsors, media, press and others, totalling some 800. 
The luncheon is a major feature of the event. Catering for any event attended by others in the catering trade is a challenge; Chapman's Awards the more so.  Being an Indian Restaurant event, the restaurateurs are from all countries of the subcontinent so it is no mean task for the caterer to satisfy 800 of his international peers, and one few caterers would attempt. 
 
The event is widely reported in the UK and in the subcontinent, and it is televised by Sony Entertainment Television Asia and is screened and repeated in Australia, Canada, Europe, Pakistan, India, Mauritius, the Middle East, New Zealand, South Africa, the United Kingdom and the United States to millions of viewers.

The Achievement
Of the 9,000 Indian restaurants in Britain, each of which are scrupulously examined, only seventy restaurants become shortlisted with four to each of the eighteen Award categories.  Of these only eighteen win the Awards.  That is one-in-500 or 0.2% (zero-point two) percentage of the total.

Timescale
The Good Curry Guide Awards ceremony has been held each time a Good Curry Guide is published as follows:

Past and present winners of "Best in the UK" award
The chief Award is the Best in the UK.

	•	1991/4 ~ Chutney Mary, SW10

	•	1995/7 ~ Bombay Brasserie, SW7

	•	1998/9 ~ La Porte des Indes, W1

	•	1999/2001 ~ Chutney Mary, SW10

	•	2002/3 ~ Quilon's, SW1

	•	2004/6 ~ Madhu's, Southall

	•	2007/8 ~ Ithiaas, Birmingham

	•	2009/10 ~ Masala World Group, London: Amaya, Chutney Mary, Veerswamys, Masala Zone (8)

	•	2013 ~ Painted Heron, SW1

Good Curry Guide Awards Categories,  2013
Regional Awards

These 25 restaurants (and one group of 11) are located all over the UK, and are considered to be the best in their region. Each of these winners, has been visited by Pat Chapman during 2012/3 and presented with their Award Certificate.

*Best in the North of England 2013

BEST UK GROUP ~ Akbars (11 restaurants):  Bradford (2), Birmingham, Glasgow,  Leeds (2),  Manchester, Middlesbrough, Newcastle, Rotherham & York.

BEST IN YORKSHIRE ~ Ashoka Sheffield

BEST IN MERSEYSIDE ~ Gulshan Liverpool

BEST IN NORTH EAST ~ Valley 397 Newcastle

*Best in the Midlands, England 2013

BEST IN MIDLANDS ~  Anoki  Burton, Derby,  Nottingham

BEST IN EAST MIDLANDS ~ Curry Fever  Leicester Leics

BEST IN WEST MIDLANDS ~ Maharaja Birmingham  West Midlands

BEST IN CENTRAL ENGLAND ~ Calcutta Brasserie Milton Keynes  Bucks

*Best in South East England 2013  (alphabetical)

BEST IN the SOUTH EAST  ~  The Ambrette Margate Kent & Rye Sussex

BEST ON SOUTH COAST  ~ Bombay Bay, Southsea Hants

BEST IN OUTER LONDON, WEST ~  Brilliant  Southall,  Middlesex

BEST IN HOME COUNTIES, NORTH ~  Chez Mumtaj St Albans, Herts

BEST IN SURREY  ~  India Dining, Warlingham, Surrey

BEST IN SOUTH ENGLAND ~ Massala, Cobham, Surrey

BEST IN HOME COUNTIES, WEST ~ Mango Lounge  Windsor Berks

BEST IN OUTER LONDON, SOUTH ~ Sesame  New Malden

*Best in South West England  2013

BEST IN THE WEST COUNTRY ~ Viceroy, Yeovil, Somerset
   
BEST IN THE SOUTH WEST ~ Mysterica, Bristol

BEST IN CORNWALL ~ Rajdoot, St Ives, Cornwall

*Best in Scotland 2013

BEST OVERALL in SCOTLAND ~ Verandah  Edinburgh

BEST IN NORTH SCOTLAND ~ Balaka   St Andrews  Fife

BEST IN EAST SCOTLAND ~ Mya, Edinburgh, Lothian

*Best in Wales 2013'

BEST IN WALES ~ Moksh   Cardiff   Glamorgan

BEST IN NORTH WALES ~ Bengal Dynasty Shotton & Llandudno

Cuisine Awards    (Not Awarded in 2012/3)
Best Bangladeshi
Best Nepalese
Best Indian
Best Pakistani
Best Sri Lankan
Best South East Asian

Speciality Awards   (Not Awarded in 2012/3)
Best Chef
Best Maître d'
Best Newcomer

Lifetime Achievement  Award   (Not Awarded in 2012/3)

Awarded 2007 to Satish Arora, Chef Culinaire, Taj Group

See also
 Pat Chapman
 The Curry Club
 Good Curry Guide

Bibliography
	•	1984 Good Curry Guide, Curry Club — 

	•	1987 Good Curry Guide, Piatkus, London — 

	•	1991 Cobra Good Curry Guide, Piatkus, London — 

	•	1995 Cobra Good Curry Guide, Piatkus, London — 

	•	1998 Cobra Good Curry Guide, Hodder & Stoughton, London — 

	•	1999 Cobra Good Curry Guide, Hodder & Stoughton, London — 

	•	2000 Cobra Curryholics’ Directory, John Blake Publishing, London — 

	•	2001 Cobra Good Curry Guide, Simon & Schuster, London — 

	•	2004 Cobra Good Curry Guide, Curry Club, Haslemere — 

	•	2007 Cobra Good Curry Guide, John Blake Publishing, London — 

	•	2009 Cobra Good Curry Guide, John Blake Publishing, London — 

	•	2010 Cobra Good Curry Guide, John Blake Publishing, London —   New cover same text as 2009.

	•	2013 Cobra Good Curry Guide, Curry Club Publisher, Haslemere —   Complete rewrite.

DVD

	•	Good Curry Guide Award Ceremony 2007 https://web.archive.org/web/20090105192355/http://www.patchapman.co.uk/catalogue/product/914/2461

References

External links
 https://web.archive.org/web/20110929175920/http://globalmalaysians.com/feature/story.asp?file=%2F2006%2F4%2F21%2Ffeature%2F13970739&sec=feature
https://web.archive.org/web/20100410135959/http://www.patchapman.co.uk/page/cobra-good-curry-guide
http://www.curryhouse.co.uk/scene/gcg2004.html
https://web.archive.org/web/20110520033239/http://londoneats.com/news/default.asp?PressID=75
https://web.archive.org/web/20100823215756/http://www.victoriasindia.co.uk/news.htm

https://web.archive.org/web/20110710204551/http://www.ethnicnow.com/channels/food-drink/press-release/11/947/itihaas-scoops -top-honours-at-2007-cobra-good-curry-awards.html
https://web.archive.org/web/20110707151940/http://aphrohead.com/Product.aspx?pid=11927505
http://www.timesonline.co.uk/tol/news/uk/article453496.ece
http://www.thisislondon.co.uk/restaurants/article-10796583-details/Britain%27s+best+curry/article.do
https://www.theguardian.com/lifeandstyle/2007/nov/11/shopping
https://www.theguardian.com/uk/2004/mar/24/foodanddrink

https://web.archive.org/web/20090105192355/http://www.patchapman.co.uk/catalogue/product/914/2461
International Chef Award-1
International Chef Award-2

Food and drink awards
British cuisine
Restaurant guides
1991 establishments in the United Kingdom